Choi Hyun-seok (born July 6, 1972) is a South Korean chef and television personality. He gained mainstream recognition for his appearances on the variety show Please Take Care of My Refrigerator, from which he became known for his flamboyant stage presence. He worked in Seoul in the Italian restaurant La Cucina before becoming the head chef at Elbon the Table, which has two branches in Seoul and one in Goyang. He is currently the head chef at Choi, a Korean-European fusion restaurant in Seoul.

References

1972 births
Living people
South Korean chefs
South Korean television chefs